Heath is a hamlet and former civil parish, now in the parish of Abdon and Heath, in the Clee Hills area of Shropshire, England.

The settlement and wider rural area historically had a larger population than now, especially in medieval times. Heath Chapel is a Norman Grade I Listed building. The civil parish was abolished on 1 April 2017 and merged with Abdon to form Abdon and Heath.

Nearby are the larger settlements of Bouldon and Clee St. Margaret.

See also
Listed buildings in Heath, Shropshire
Deserted medieval village

References

Villages in Shropshire
Former civil parishes in Shropshire